The 2nd Beijing College Student Film Festival was held in 1995 in Beijing, China.

Awards
 Best Film Award: Back to Back, Face to Face, Family Scandal
 Best Actor Award: Niu Zhenhua for Back to Back, Face to Face
 Best Actress Award: Ding Jiali for No More Applause
 Best Visual Effects Award: Going East To Native Land, Red Firecracker, Green Firecracker
 Special Award for Comedy: Fool in Love
 Artistic Exploration Award: None
 Committee Special Award: Country Teachers
 Special Jury Award: Mr. Wang's Burning Desire

References

External links

Beijing College Student Film Festival
1995 film festivals
1995 festivals in Asia
Bei